The Frontal Assessment Battery (FAB) is a short screening test to evaluate executive function (EF).

Format
FAB is a battery of tests, consisting of six subtests, that takes about 10 minutes and is designed as a short bedside assessment of executive function.

Applications
FAB is useful in the differential diagnosis of neurological diseases including Parkinson's disease, corticobasal degeneration, frontotemporal dementias, Alzheimer's disease, Huntington's disease, progressive supranuclear palsy, and dementia with Lewy bodies.

Development
FAB was developed by Dubois et al. in 2000 and became a widely used tool.

References

Mental disorders screening and assessment tools
Neuropsychological tests
Medical scoring system
Parkinson's disease
Cognitive disorders
Dementia